Pauline Ng (born 1 December 1985) is a Singaporean entrepreneur who founded Porcelain, a successful skincare cult brand, in 2009. After graduating from Singapore Management University, Pauline decided to forgo job opportunities at a Melbourne-based HR consultancy firm and another international marketing firm to take the road less travelled, despite difficult economic times in 2009.

In 2010, Pauline led Porcelain to cross the S$1 million mark in revenue, while continuing to push the boundaries within. Under her leadership, Porcelain grew from a 2-man team to a company of close to 100 today.

Her relentless drive to achieve service perfection also helped Porcelain land the prestigious World Luxury Spa Awards for 7 consecutive years from 2013 to 2019. Porcelain is also a recognized spa with more than 80 media accolades and was even featured in the likes of the Louis Vuitton City Guide (Singapore edition), BBC, Forbes, etc.

In June 2016, she was the youngest winner of the inaugural Teochew Entrepreneur Award in 2016 presented by Deputy Prime Minister Tharman Shamugaratnam, after being selected as one of the BBC's "30 under 30" women in November 2015. This was followed by clinching the Winner of the Pulsar category in the Women Entrepreneur Awards 2018.

Today, Pauline aspires to grow Porcelain into more than just a cult skincare brand. Always one to push the boundaries, Pauline conceptualized Singapore’s first smart spa into fruition in 2018. She dreamed of a spa experience that leverages on technology to create a seamless omni-channel customer experience across all physical and digital touchpoints… and launched Porcelain Origins, Porcelain’s latest concept store at Paragon, that utilizes tech and innovation to enhance consumer engagement, satisfaction and experience.

Biography
Ng was born on 1 December 1985 in Singapore to a middle class family.

Her mother is a beautician and her father, a retired classical guitar player. At the age of 17, she had started her own events company.

In 2009, shortly after Ng had graduated from SMU, her mother Jenny Teng sought her assistance in relaunching her facial care business. While her mother was skilled in facial treatments, she had little business experience. Porcelain, the new company, was founded and managed by Ng, who also took care of marketing and procurement, while Teng took charge of the treatments and staff training.

From modest beginnings, the company expanded rapidly thanks to its high level of service and outstanding treatment and product results. Ng reinvested the profits into hiring more staff and in developing a line of Porcelain skin care products. By collaborating with facial care firms in the United States, Japan and Taiwan, the range of products was extended. By 2013, the business itself had revenues of US$1 million and was recognized as Asia's Best Luxury Beauty Spa at the World Luxury Spa Awards. By mid-2016, the business was employing a team of 45, most of them therapists. They have three outlets and an online store - PorcelainSkin.com/Shop.

A firm believer of holistic wellbeing, Pauline encourages a good balance between work and play, indulging in music, traveling, diving, skiing and exploring.

Awards and media features 
 2015 - She was recognized as one of the BBC's 100 women.
 2016 - Pauline was recognized by the inaugural Teochew Entrepreneur Award and emerged the Grand Winner in the Promising category. She was the only female and also the youngest amongst other contenders, receiving the prestigious award from DPM Tharman Shamugaratnam. 
 2017 - As part of her personal challenge to conquer her fears of public speaking, she accepted multiple speaking opportunities, including a Startup Conference in Ho Chih Minh in July, and as a Panelist at the SME Conference organized by SCCCI and Spring Singapore. 
 2018 – Winner of the Pulsar category in the Women Entrepreneur Awards 2018

Other accolades include:

References

External links
Our Founding Story from Porcelain

1985 births
People from Singapore
Singaporean women in business
Singapore Management University alumni
Living people
BBC 100 Women
21st-century Singaporean women